Willi Ziegler (born 13 March 1929 in the neighborhood of Villingen in Hungen, Hessen; died 8 August 2002) was a German paleontologist.

Works 
In 1969, he described the conodont genus Protognathodus.

In 1984, with Charles A. Sandberg, he described the conodont genus Alternognathus.

In 2002, with IA Bardashev and K Weddige, he described the conodont genus Eolinguipolygnathus.

Ziegler's Catalogue of Conodonts 
 Ziegler's Catalogue of Conodonts. Schweizerbart Science Publishers (link to editor website, retrieved 7 May 2016)
 Volume I, 1973
 Volume II, 1975
 Volume III, 1977
 Volume IV, 1981
 Volume V, 1991

Awards and tributes 
In 1998, he received the Goethe-Plakette des Landes Hessen, the highest award by the Hessian Ministry for Science and the Arts in Hesse, Germany.

He was also a recipient of the Pander Medal, awarded by the Pander Society, for researches in conodonts paleontology.

The conodont genus name Zieglerodina and the conodont species name Lochriea ziegleri are tributes to W. Ziegler.

References 

 Willi Ziegler 13. März 1929 – 8. August 2002. Karsten Weddige, Paläontologische Zeitschrift, April 2003, Volume 77, Issue 1, pages 1–21,  (article in German)

German paleontologists
Conodont specialists
1929 births
2002 deaths
20th-century German zoologists